The 2019 GT World Challenge Europe (known for sponsorship reasons as the 2019 Blancpain GT World Challenge Europe) was the seventh season of the GT World Challenge Europe following on from the demise of the SRO Motorsports Group's FIA GT1 World Championship (an auto racing series for grand tourer cars), the first with the sponsorship of Blancpain. The season began on 4 May at Brands Hatch and ended on 8 September at the Hungaroring. It was the first season of the unification of GT3 sprint series across the globe under the World Challenge name.

Calendar
At the annual press conference during the 2018 24 Hours of Spa on 27 July, the Stéphane Ratel Organisation announced the first draft of the 2019 calendar. Zolder was initially replaced by the Red Bull Ring, before Zandvoort was chosen to host a race weekend. The Endurance Cup round in Barcelona would become an World Challenge Europe round, replacing the round at the Nürburgring, before the two tracks were swapped around again in the final draft of the calendar released on 22 October.

Entry list
A cap of 30 cars was placed in an attempt to reduce accidents on narrower tracks.

Race results
Bold indicates overall winner.

Championship standings
Scoring system
Championship points are awarded for the first ten positions in each race. The pole-sitter also receives one point and entries are required to complete 75% of the winning car's race distance in order to be classified and earn points. Individual drivers are required to participate for a minimum of 25 minutes in order to earn championship points in any race.

Drivers' championships

Overall

Silver Cup

Pro-Am Cup

Am Cup

Teams' championships

Overall

Silver Cup

Pro-Am Cup

Am Cup

See also
2019 Blancpain GT Series
2019 Blancpain GT Series Endurance Cup
2019 Blancpain GT World Challenge America
2019 Blancpain GT World Challenge Asia

References

External links

World Challenge Europe